The Psilidae are family of flies. Commonly called the rust flies, at least 38 species are in four genera. The carrot fly (Chamaepsila rosae) is a member of this group. They are found mainly in the Holarctic.

Description
For terms see Morphology of Diptera
These are small or medium-sized (1.5 mm.-10 mm.) flies with slender bodies. They are yellow to reddish, brown or black in colour. The head is spherical with (relatively) small eyes and the face is often slanted backward. The antennae are small, with the third antennal segment conspicuously elongated. The arista has a short or long pubescence. The postvertical bristles are divergent or absent. Ocelli and ocellar bristles are present. Vibrissae are always absent. Up to two pairs of frontal bristles and scattered interfrontal setulae are present. The costa is  interrupted at some distance from R1 and only the basal part of the subcosta is developed. The vein bordering the anal cell is straight on the outer side. Crossvein BM-Cu is present and the cell cup is closed. The wing is usually clear to slightly tinged, but in some cases along the costa, the wing tip or the cross-veins there are dark bands. The wing has a transverse weakening in the basal half. Tibiae are without a dorsal preapical bristle. 
See  Description and plates from Francis Walker's Insecta Britannica Diptera.

Biology
Psilidae are especially common in cool places on low-density vegetation. This explains why the family is well represented in temperate zones. The larvae are almost exclusively phytophagous on nonwoody plants. They live either in stems, tubers, or roots. A few species live under tree bark. Some form galls. Several species are pests in agriculture and horticulture. Chamaepsila rosae Fabricius, and Psila nigricornis  Meigen are instances.

List of genera

Belobackenbardia
Chamaepsila
Chyliza
Loxocera
Loxocerosoma
Oxypsila
Phytopsila
Psila
Psilosoma
Schizostomyia
Synaphopsila
Tropeopsila

References

Further reading

Distribution
Western Palaearctic (including Russia,Turkey)
Nearctic
Japan
World list

Identification
Hennig. 1941. Psilidae.In: Lindner, E. (Ed.). Die Fliegen der Paläarktischen Region 5,41,1-38. Keys to Palaearctic species but now needs revision (in German).
Séguy, E. (1934) Diptères: Brachycères. II. Muscidae acalypterae, Scatophagidae. Paris: Éditions Faune de France 28. virtuelle numérique
Stackelberg, A.A. Family Psilidae in  Bei-Bienko, G. Ya, 1988 Keys to the insects of the European Part of the USSR Volume 5 (Diptera) Part 2 English edition.Keys to Palaearctic species but now needs revision .

External links

Family Psilidae at EOL images
Image Gallery at Diptera.info
Wing venation
Description in the Australasian/Oceanian Diptera Catalog hosted at Bishop Museum

 
Brachycera families
Articles containing video clips